was the fourth of six s, built for the Imperial Japanese Navy under the Circle One Program (Maru Ichi Keikaku). Three were laid down in JFY 1931 and the next three in JFY 1933.

History
Construction of the advanced Hatsuharu-class destroyers was intended to give the Imperial Japanese Navy smaller and more economical destroyers than the previous  and  destroyers, but with essentially the same weaponry. These conflicting goals proved beyond contemporary destroyer design, and the resulting ships were top-heavy design, with severe stability problems and with inherent structural weaknesses. After the "Tomozuru Incident" of 1934 and "IJN 4th Fleet Incident" in 1935, Wakaba underwent extensive modifications on completion to remedy these issues.

The Hatsuharu-class destroyers used the same 50 caliber 12.7 cm gun as the Fubuki class, but all turrets could elevate to 75° to give the main guns a minimal ability to engage aircraft. During the war the single turret was removed on all surviving ships after 1942. The only anti-aircraft guns were two water-cooled, license-built Vickers  (pom pom). These guns were deemed to be too heavy, slow-firing and short-ranged and were replaced by license-built French Hotchkiss  Type 96 anti-aircraft guns in single, double and triple mounts from 1943 for the surviving ships. These powered mounts were still unsatisfactory because their traverse and elevation speeds were too slow to engage high-speed aircraft and more single mounts were fitted to ships in the last year of the war.

The 61 cm Type 90 torpedo was mounted in triple tube Type 90 Model 2 launchers It was traversed by an electro-hydraulic system and could traverse 360° in twenty-five seconds. If the backup manual system was used the time required increased to two minutes. Each tube could be reloaded in twenty-three seconds using the endless wire and winch provided.
Hatsushimo was laid down on 31 January 1933, launched on 4 November 1933 and commissioned on 27 September 1934.

Operational history
On completion, Hatsushimo was assigned to the IJN 2nd Fleet. During the Second Sino-Japanese War, from 1937, Hatsushimo covered landing of Japanese forces in Shanghai and Hangzhou. From 1940, she was assigned to patrol and cover landings of Japanese forces in south China, and participated in the Invasion of French Indochina.

World War II history
From the end of January 1942, she deployed with the invasion force for the Netherlands East Indies as part of "Operation H", covering landing operations at Kendari on Sulawesi on 24 January, Makassar on 8 February, and Bali and Lombok on 18 February. She returned to Sasebo Naval Arsenal at the end of March for maintenance.

After returning briefly to Yokosuka Naval Arsenal for maintenance, she continued to patrol in the Chishima Islands, deploying out of Paramushiro or Shumushu to Attu and Kiska, making numerous transport runs to deploy supplies and reinforcements until December.

Hatsushimo returned to Sasebo at the end of 1942, and during a refit, her aft  (pom pom) was replaced by twin  Type 96 anti-aircraft guns.

Hatsushimo returned to northern waters from January 1943, continuing patrols and resupply transport missions to the Aleutians. On 26 March, she participated in the Battle of the Komandorski Islands as part of the IJN 5th Fleet, and unsuccessfully engaged United States Navy forces at long range with torpedoes.

Hatsushimo rejoined the IJN 5th Fleet in northern waters in mid-May, escorting convoys between Paramushiro and Ōminato to late June. On 26 July, Hatsushimo rammed Wakaba in the stern and was rammed in turn by Naganami during heavy fog,  suffering moderate damage. On her return to Yokosuka for a months of repairs in September, a Type 22 radar was installed, the “X”-turret was removed, and additional 25 mm anti-aircraft guns were added.

At the start of 1944, Hatsushimo was reassigned directly to Combined Fleet headquarters, and continued in escort patrol missions between Yokosuka and Truk. She returned to Sasebo on 14 April, where additional 25 mm anti-aircraft guns were added along with an additional Type 22 radar. In June, she participated in the Battle of the Philippine Sea as part of the First Supply Force, and continued in escort missions between Japan and the Philippines through September. In a maintenance refit at Kure Naval Arsenal, additional 25-mm anti-aircraft guns and a Type 13 radar were added.  Hatsushimo continued with transport and escort missions to the Philippines through November.

On 24 October 1944, after the Battle of Leyte Gulf, Hatsushimo rescued 74 survivors from the sunken Wakaba  On 15 November 1944, Hatsushimo was reassigned to the IJN 2nd Fleet and assigned to escort missions between Singapore and Cam Ranh Bay in French Indochina through the end of the year. It came just two days after her flotilla leader Hatsuharu had been sunk in shallow waters by US air attacks off Manila.

While at Kure, yet more 25-mm anti-aircraft guns were installed. In April 1945, Hatsushimo was part of the escort for the battleship  during her final Operation Ten-Go.

She was subsequently reassigned to Maizuru for use as a training and guard vessels. The attack killed 17 crewmen. Hatsushimo was the 129th and last destroyer of the Imperial Japanese Navy to be lost during the war.

On 30 September 1945, Hatsushimo was removed from the navy list. Her wreck was salvaged and broken up between 1948 and 1949. Her anchor is collected at the time of disassembly and it is exhibited in a hospital in Tokyo.

Notes

References

 OCLC 77257764

External links

Hatsuharu-class destroyers
Second Sino-Japanese War naval ships of Japan
World War II destroyers of Japan
Ships built by Uraga Dock Company
1933 ships
Ships of the Aleutian Islands campaign
Maritime incidents in July 1945
World War II shipwrecks in the Sea of Japan
Ships sunk by mines